Słonowice may refer to the following places:
Słonowice, Pomeranian Voivodeship (north Poland)
Słonowice, Świętokrzyskie Voivodeship (south-central Poland)
Słonowice, West Pomeranian Voivodeship (north-west Poland)